Han-bin is a Korean masculine given name. Its meaning differs based on the hanja used to write each syllable of the name. There are 23 hanja with the reading "han" and 25 hanja with the reading "bin" on the South Korean government's official list of hanja which may be used in given names. 

Notable people with this name include:
Lee Han-bin (born 1988), South Korean short track speed skater
Yoo Hanbin (born 1988), stage name Amadéus Leopold, South Korean violinist
Kim Han-bin (born 1991), South Korean football defender (K-League Challenge)
Yang Han-been (born 1991), South Korean football goalkeeper (K-League Classic)
B.I (rapper) (born Kim Han-bin, 1996), South Korean rapper, former member of boy band iKon
Park Han-bin (born 1997), South Korean football midfielder (K-League Challenge)
Hanbin (born Ngô Ngọc Hưng, 1998), Vietnamese singer, member of boy band Tempest

See also
List of Korean given names

References